The Moore House is a historic house in Winchester, Massachusetts.  The -story Gothic Revival house was probably built sometime in the 1840s, possibly by George Moore, a local builder whose family was listed as resident there 1865–1931.

The house is distinctive for having three steeply pitched gable dormers in front, decorated with vergeboard, and for a small mansard-roofed tower added to the rear in the 1870s.  The single-story front porch has a flat roof, with a decorative jigsawn valance.

The house was listed on the National Register of Historic Places in 1989.

See also
Abijah Thompson House, at 81 Walnut Street
National Register of Historic Places listings in Winchester, Massachusetts

References

Houses on the National Register of Historic Places in Winchester, Massachusetts
Houses in Winchester, Massachusetts